Gastão Elias was the defending champion but lost in the first round to Guilherme Clezar.

Nicolás Kicker won the title after defeating Arthur De Greef 6–3, 6–2 in the final.

Seeds

Draw

Finals

Top half

Bottom half

References
Main Draw
Qualifying Draw

Challenger Ciudad de Guayaquil - Singles